A total solar eclipse will occur on Monday, November 25, 2030. A solar eclipse occurs when the Moon passes between Earth and the Sun, thereby totally or partly obscuring the image of the Sun for a viewer on Earth. A total solar eclipse occurs when the Moon's apparent diameter is larger than the Sun's, blocking all direct sunlight, turning day into darkness. Totality occurs in a narrow path across Earth's surface, with the partial solar eclipse visible over a surrounding region thousands of kilometres wide.

Images 
Animated path

Related eclipses

Solar eclipses 2029–2032

Saros 133

Metonic series

References

External links 

2030 11 25
2030 11 25
2030 11 25
2030 in science